Milo Lemert (March 25, 1890 – September 29, 1918) was a soldier in the United States Army who received the Medal of Honor for his actions during World War I.

Biography
Lemert was born in Marshalltown, Iowa on March 25, 1890, and died September 29, 1918, Near Bellicourt, France. He was a member of First Christian Church in Crossville, Tennessee. His funeral service was conducted at the church before his burial in Crossville City Cemetery.

Medal of Honor citation
Rank and organization: First Sergeant, U.S. Army, Company G, 119th Infantry, 30th Division. Place and date: Near Bellicourt, France, 29 September 1918. Entered service at: Crossville, Tenn. Birth: Marshalltown, Iowa. G.O. No.: 59, W.D., 1919.

Citation:

Seeing that the left flank of his company was held up, he located the enemy machinegun emplacement, which had been causing heavy casualties. In the face of heavy fire he rushed it single-handed, killing the entire crew with grenades. Continuing along the enemy trench in advance of the company, he reached another emplacement, which he also charged, silencing the gun with grenades. A third machinegun emplacement opened up on him from the left and with similar skill and bravery he destroyed this also. Later, in company with another sergeant, he attacked a fourth machinegun nest, being killed as he reached the parapet of the emplacement. His courageous action in destroying in turn 4 enemy machinegun nests prevented many casualties among his company and very materially aided in achieving the objective.

See also

List of Medal of Honor recipients
List of Medal of Honor recipients for World War I

References

External links

Iowa Medal of Honor Heroes

United States Army Medal of Honor recipients
United States Army non-commissioned officers
American military personnel killed in World War I
People from Marshalltown, Iowa
People from Crossville, Tennessee
Military personnel from Iowa
World War I recipients of the Medal of Honor
Burials in Tennessee
1890 births
1918 deaths